Allensbach is a municipality in the district of Konstanz in Baden-Württemberg in Germany.

Allensbach is located between Konstanz and Radolfzell on Lake Constance.

Notable institution
Allensbach is known for being the home of the Institut für Demoskopie Allensbach (also known as Allensbach Institute), one of the best known opinion-polling organizations in Germany.

World heritage site
It is home to one or more prehistoric pile-dwelling (or stilt house) settlements that are part of the, added in 2011, Prehistoric Pile dwellings around the Alps UNESCO World Heritage Site.

References

Konstanz (district)